Jennings Bluff is a dark, flat-topped outcrop in the Nicholas Range of Antarctica,  north of Mount Storegutt. The bluff was discovered by the British Australian New Zealand Antarctic Research Expedition, 1929–31, under Mawson. It was mapped by Norwegian cartographers from aerial photos taken by the Lars Christensen Expedition, 1936–37, and called Brattstabben (the Steep Stump). It was photographed from Australian National Antarctic Research Expeditions aircraft in 1956 and remapped, and was renamed by the Antarctic Names Committee of Australia in 1961 for Noel Durrent Jennings, an assistant diesel mechanic at Mawson Station in 1960.

References

Cliffs of Antarctica
Landforms of Enderby Land